is a railway station on the Takayama Main Line in the city of Hida,  Gifu Prefecture, Japan, operated by Central Japan Railway Company (JR Central).

Lines

Station layout
Tsunogawa Station has one ground-level side platform serving single bi-directional track. The station is unattended.

Adjacent stations

History
Tsunogawa Station opened on October 25, 1934. The station was absorbed into the JR Central network upon the privatization of Japanese National Railways (JNR) on April 1, 1987.

Surrounding area

See also
 List of Railway Stations in Japan

External links

Railway stations in Gifu Prefecture
Takayama Main Line
Railway stations in Japan opened in 1934
Stations of Central Japan Railway Company
Hida, Gifu